Colias erate, the eastern pale clouded yellow, is a butterfly in the family Pieridae. It is found from south-eastern Europe, through Turkey over central Asia up to Japan and Taiwan. To the south, its range stretches to Somalia and Ethiopia. The species was first described by Eugenius Johann Christoph Esper in 1805.

The wingspan is 23–26 mm. The butterfly flies in May to September in two generations.

The larvae feed on various Fabaceae species, such as Medicago sativa and Medicago, Trifolium, Onobrychis and Melilotus species.

Subspecies
C. e. erate (Ukraine, Turkey, Lebanon, Bulgaria, Romania, Macedonia, Greece, Hungary, Austria, Turkmenistan, Kazakhstan, Kirhizia, Uzbekistan, Tajikistan, Afghanistan)
C. e. amdensis Verity, 1911 (China: Qinghai, Gansu, Sichuan)
C. e. marnoana Rogenhofer, 1884 (Sudan, Ethiopia, south-western Arabia)
C. e. sinensis Verity, 1911 (Mandschuria, North Korea)
C. e. formosana Shirôzu, 1955 (Taiwan)
C. e. lativitta Moore, 1882 (Nepal, northern India)
C. e. poliographus Motschulsky, 1860 (Mongolia, Japan, Amur, Ussuri, Sakhalin, Tian Shan)
C. e. tomarias Bryk, 1942 (Kuriles)
C. e. naukratis Fruhstorfer, 1909 (Altai, southern Siberia, Transbaikalia)
C. e. nilagiriensis C. & R. Felder, 1859 (southern India)

Description

Frederic Moore (1882) gives a detailed description for C. e. lativitta:

Gallery

Cited references

External links
 Russian Insects poliographus Motschulsky, 1860
 www.lepiforum.de - taxonomy and photos
 www.schmetterling-raupe.de
 Moths and Butterflies of Europe and North Africa
 Fauna Europaea

erate
Butterflies of Asia
Butterflies described in 1805
Butterflies of Europe